Gabriel Jackson (March 10, 1921 – November 3, 2019) was an American Hispanist, historian and journalist. He was born in Mount Vernon, New York in 1921. After his retirement he lived in Barcelona, Spain.

A victim of McCarthyism, he studied at Harvard and Stanford before attaining his doctorate at Université de Toulouse. A Fulbright scholar (1960–1961), he obtained his professorship in 1965 and was Professor Emeritus at University of California, San Diego.

A disciple of both Jaume Vicens i Vives and the prominent French historian Pierre Vilar, Jackson was a regular collaborator of the Spanish daily El País for many years. In 1966 he was awarded the American Historical Association's Herbert Baxter Adams Prize, and in 2002, Spain's prestigious Nebrija Prize from the University of Salamanca.

Works 
The Spanish Republic and the Civil War 1931–39. Princeton (N.J.): Princeton University Press, 1965
La República Española y la Guerra Civil: 1931–1939. Barcelona: Crítica, 1999
--do.--[Esplugues de Llobregat]: Orbis, 1985
--do.--Barcelona: Mundo Actual de Ediciones, 1978
The Spanish Civil War: Domestic Crisis or international Conspiracy. Boston: D. C. Heath, 1967
--do.--Chicago: Quadrangle Books, 1972
Histoire de la Guerre civile de l'Espagne. Paris: Ruedo Ibérico, 1974
Historian's Quest. New York: Knopf, 1969
Historia de un historiador. Madrid: Anaya & Mario Muchnik, cop. 1993
A Concise History of the Spanish Civil War. London: Thames and Hudson, 1974
Breve historia de la Guerra Civil Española. Barcelona : Grijalbo, 1986
--do.--[Paris]: Ruedo Ibérico, 1974
Civilization & Barbarity in 20th Century Europe
Civilización y barbarie en Europa del siglo XX. Barcelona: Planeta, 1997
Fighting for Franco: International Volunteers in Nationalist Spain During the Spanish Civil War, 1936–39 by Judith Keene and Gabriel Jackson. Leicester University Press, 2001
Luchando por Franco: voluntarios europeos al servicio del España fascista. [Barcelona]: Salvat, 2002
Making of Mediaeval Spain (Library of European Civilization)
Juan Negrín: physiologist, socialist and Spanish Republican war leader. Cañada Blanch Centre for Contemporary Spanish Studies; Brighton: Sussex Academic Press, 2010
Costa, Azaña, el Frente Popular y otros ensayos. Barcelona: Crítica, 2008—do.--Madrid: Turner, 1976
Memoria de un historiador. Madrid: Temas de Hoy, 2001
Ciudadano Jackson: visiones de la mundo contemporáneo. Barcelona: Martínez Roca, 2001
Origines de la Guerra fría. Madrid: Información e Historia, 1993
El Kapellmeister Mozart. Barcelona: Empúries, 1991
Mozart. Barcelona: Empúries, 1991
El difunto Kapellmeister Mozart. Barcelona: Muchnik, 1991
Catalunya republicana i revolucionària: 1931–1939. Barcelona: Grijalbo, 1982
La Guerra civil española: antologia de los principales cronistas de guerra americanos en España (editor) Barcelona: Icaria, 1978 
The Making of Medieval Spain. London: Thames and Hudson, 1972
--do.--[New York]: Harcourt Brace Jovanovich, 1972
Introducción a la España medieval; ed. 3a. Madrid: Alianza, 1979

References

External links

 Jackson breaks down into tears discussing Spanish history, 37:10 to 37:25 
  Tribute to the hispanist Gabriel Jackson, held on Saturday, February 29, 2020, at the Teresa Pàmies Cultural Center in Barcelona. 

1921 births
2019 deaths
Harvard University alumni
Stanford University alumni
University of Toulouse alumni
University of California, San Diego faculty
American Hispanists
Historians from New York (state)
Writers from Mount Vernon, New York
American expatriates in Spain
American expatriates in France
Journalists from New York (state)
21st-century American journalists
20th-century American journalists
American male journalists
21st-century American male writers
20th-century American male writers
Fulbright alumni